Oliver Alan White (born 26 January 1995) is an English YouTuber. In August 2012, he began posting videos on the YouTube channel Oli White. As of February 2023, his channel has over 475 million views and over 2.6 million subscribers. In 2014, he performed the role of James in the AwesomenessTV web series production of Shipping Julia. In November 2015, he acted in Joe and Caspar Hit The Road with Joe Sugg and Caspar Lee. In May 2016, he released his first book, Generation Next and his second book, Generation Next: The Takeover was released in 2017.

Career
White created his Oli White channel in August 2012 and was able to reach 1 million subscribers three years later. In April 2021, he had over 2.7 million subscribers and over 469 million views. His videos consist of challenges, mostly food challenges, featuring his brother James.

In 2014, White starred in AwesomenessTV's web series Shipping Julia, playing the role of James, a veteran cruiser who develops a romantic relationship with Julia. In 2015, White hosted the CBBC 8-episode television series Cinemaniacs. Later that year, he hosted Disney XD UK's Mega Awesome Super Hacks, alongside Jimmy Hill and Mawaan Rizwan, and appeared as himself in the British documentary film Joe and Caspar Hit the Road. In 2016, he starred as The Big Game Hunter in the first season of American murder-mystery web series Escape the Night, hosted by Joey Graceffa, and returned briefly in the second season's pilot episode.

White has written two books, Generation Next, released in May 2016 and a sequel, Generation Next: The Takeover, released in 2017.

White launched a CBD brand, Unique CBD, in August 2020.

Personal life
White was born in Iver, England. He attended Pirton School.

Filmography

Film

Television

Web

Awards and nominations

References

External links 
 
 

1995 births
21st-century English male writers
21st-century English novelists
Male actors from Buckinghamshire
Comedy YouTubers
English male film actors
English male television actors
English male web series actors
English YouTubers
Gaming YouTubers
Living people
People from South Bucks District
English video bloggers